Michel Gordillo is a world record aviator, and the first person to circumpolar navigate the world in an experimental aircraft with a mass of less than 1750 kilograms. He was commander of Iberia Airlines piloting Airbus A319, A320, and A321. In total he has more than 15,000 hours of flight. Gordillo is also a glider pilot, holding the title C silver, and is a member of the Spanish national glider team. He is fluent in Spanish, French and English.

Life and times
Michel Gordillo, born on 2 May 1955 as Miguel Ángel Gordillo Urquia in French Cameroun at Douala near the volcano Mount Cameroon, and lived there until the age of seven. The family moved to the capital, Yaoundé, during the independence movement of Cameroon. In 1967, the family moved to Cannes, France, and then to Madrid, Spain. After he completed the Baccalaureate, he entered the Spanish Air Force Academy selection group after passing a public examination. At present, Gordillo is retired and lives with his family in Spain.

Career

Spanish Air Force
He gained admission to the Spanish Air Force to train to be a future pilot. At San Javier in Murcia, Spain, he went through military training and after two years started flight training. The first aircraft was a Beechcraft T-34 Mentor, and he flew solo and also received aerobatics training. He flew Beechcraft Bonanza planes and received navigation training (both visual and radio navigation). During his last year at the Academia General del Aire (AGA), he received advanced flight training with T-6 Texan aircraft. Gordillo completed flight training that included formation flying, aerobatics, combat flying and Instrument Flight Rules (IFR) flying.  He received the fighter pilot aptitude, but took slot 20 of 24 and the fighter school only took the first 18 slots. Next came IFR multiengine training for one year at Salamanca where he flew the Spanish designed CASA C-212 Aviocar airplane. Gordillo was then assigned to the P3 Orion anti-submarine warfare aircraft. (Note: in Spain the P-3 Orion is assigned to the Air Force, not the Navy.) He became a fighter pilot, but was assigned as a ship and submarine fighter pilot. He flew the P-3 for seven years and became a crew leader. This is where he learned the challenges of locating someone in the water, as he also served in search and rescue aircraft and maritime patrol aircraft capacities. This experience would later serve him for his long distance oceanic flights. While assigned to the P-3 squadron, Gordillo received orders for one year to attend undergraduate and advanced navigator training with the U.S. Air Force at Mather Air Force Base in Sacramento, California. After his P-3 Orion assignment, he was transferred to the 45th Air Force Group. The Group is responsible for transporting VIP people, like the King of Spain and his family, government ministers and dignitaries, and other government officials. Gordillo flew the Falcon 20 aircraft. Gordillo made the decision to retire rather than advance to major in the Air Force and receive an assignment as a desk jockey rather than a flight jockey.

Iberia Airlines
In 1987, Gordillo went to work for Iberia Airlines and flew the DC-9, as copilot. Then he moved up to the MD-87 aircraft for Iberia and was trained at Los Angeles. Next came long range aircraft, the four engine Airbus A340 for flights from Miami. In 1998, he was promoted to captain, and assigned to fly the twin engine Airbus A320, and later, Airbus A319 and Airbus A321. Gordillo retired at the age of 58.

Iberia incident
On 5 January 2006, acting as captain of Flight 161 of Iberia Airlines, Gordillo refused to take off for safety and security reasons due to faulty fire detector that had not been repaired. This resulted in his termination. During the judicial proceedings that ensued, a hearing was held on 22 June 2006 and his dismissal was declared inadmissible. However, by 15 November 2006, Gordillo was not reinstated to Iberia Airlines.

Aircraft

Model aircraft
As a boy, Gordillo was given a control line Air Cobra airplane, with a .049 engine. Unfortunately, he was never able to start the engine. Gordillo bought his first magazine: Le modèle reduit d´avion, a model aircraft magazine. The magazine changed his life and set the course for his calling in life. The magazine remains in his possession.
Gordillo developed an interest in model airplanes, first with U-Line models, with .15 engines (combat and aerobatics). He entered the Aeromodelling School. He moved on to free flight models. First gliders and then powered models called FAI F1C (International Aeronautics Federation: F1 stands for free flight and C fuel powered engines) He also flies F1B, rubber powered models.
After he completed the Baccalaureate, he entered the Spanish Air Force Academy selection group after passing a public examination. Gordillo spent one year at Granada waiting for a chance to become an Air Force pilot.

Gliders
While in the Spanish Air Force, Gordillo was able to attend glider school at Jerez.
Gordillo received his initial glider instruction at Monflorite in Huesca, Spain. He flew the Blaník type glider for three or four flights and then upgraded to the Pirate type glider. For flight number 8 he flew for 5.5 hours and qualified for Silver C. On flight 9 he achieved Silver C distance and altitude and finally flew for flight number 10, to actually receive the C glider rating together with the Silver C glider rating, something that no one had ever achieved in Spain.

Kit planes
Ever since Gordillo was in the Air Force Academy, he wanted to build his own airplane. Not until he became a commercial airline pilot was Gordillo able to build his first real aircraft, the Denny Kitfox IV. The Kitfox was powered by an 80-horsepower (60 kW) Rotax 912. A good aircraft to fly slow and low. The next plane he built was a Dyn'Aéro MCR01 aircraft with a Rotax 912S engine. The most recent aircraft built was a Van's Aircraft RV-8.

Circumnavigational flights

Madosh
The idea of "Madosh" (a portmanteau of the Madrid to Oshkosh flight) came about in 1996, since Gordillo wanted to fly into Oshkosh, Wisconsin for EAA AirVenture Oshkosh. Oshkosh is known as the Mecca of experimental aircraft builders. His plan was to take a different approach and fly eastward, into the sun, instead of flying west, from Spain. The Spanish Air Force and Iberia Airlines provided him support and sponsorship, and the dream became reality in 1998.

Into the Sunrise
His next project was to build a Dyn'Aéro MCR01 aircraft with a Rotax 912S engine. The flight plan this time called for another around the world flight and was called "Into the Sunrise." Iberia Airlines and the Spanish Air Force provided support and sponsorship for the flight in 2001. Gordillo flew east from Madrid and arrived in Oshkosh safely.

Sky Polaris
After taking some time off from building experimental aircraft, in 2003 Gordillo began making plans to build and fly the plane of his dreams, a Van's Aircraft RV-8. The project had three main goals. One goal was to collect atmospheric pollution data over remote area such as the desert areas, oceans, and the Arctic and Antarctic poles where no other small aircraft have previously flown. Another goal was to establish a new record maintained by the Fédération Aéronautique Internationale (FAI), the C-1b record category for flight distance by light aircraft. The final goal was for Gordillo to complete a third circumnavigation in an experimental aircraft, the RV-8. Previous flights were completed in 1998 in a Denney Kitfox Model IV, and then in 2001 in a Dyn'Aéro MCR01.
Gordillo utilized an aethalometer to collect samples. The data collected during the flight will be analyzed in a project promoted by the Interuniversity Research Institute of the Earth System in Andalusia and the University of Granada. The object of the study will be to increase the body of evidence and knowledge regarding the role of the solid pollutants in global climate change. Previously Matevž Lenarčič utilized an aethalometer to collect samples during his circumnavigation flight.[

The aircraft
For the circumpolar navigational trek, Gordillo flew a Van's Aircraft RV-8, an experimental aircraft. The RV-8 is a high performance craft with a maximum airspeed of 356 km/h (221 mph). The aircraft is powered by a Superior XP IO-360 engine with 180-horsepower.

Journey North
Madrid to North Pole to Madrid.... (Miles noted are approximate flight distances in kilometers (km)).
Jerez, Spain to Dakar, Senegal; 2700 km. Dakar, Senegal to Natal, Brazil; 3010 km. Natal to Belem, Brazil; 1600 km. Belem to Santarem, Brazil; 720 km. Santarem to Manaus, Brazil; 590 km. Manuas to Boa Vista, Roraima, Brazil; 670 km. Boa Vista, Brazil to Angel Falls, Venezuela; 410 km. Auyan Tepui in Venezuela then west to Medellín, Colombia; 1450 km. Medellin to Guatemala City, Guatemala; 1900 km. Flew over Panama, Costa Rica, Nicaragua, El Salvador and Guatemala. He landed at La Aurora International Airport, in Guatemala City, Guatemala. Guatemala to Huatulco, Mexico; 630 km. Huatulco to Toluca, Mexico; 540 km. Toluca, Mexico to Reynosa, Mexico; 770 km. Reynosa, Mexico to Freeport, Grand Bahama; 1950 km. Freeport, Grand Bahama to Windsor, Ontario, Canada; 1800 km. Windsor, Ontario, Canada to Red Lake, Ontario, Canada; 1270 km. Red Lake, Ontario to Rankin Inlet, Nunavut; 1320 km. Rankin Inlet, Nunavut, MB to Resolute, Nunavut, Canada; 1330 km. Resolute, Nunavut, Canada to the North Pole; 650 km. North Pole to Longyearbyen, Norway; 1050 km. Longyearbyen, Norway to Ålesund Airport, Vigra, Norway; 115 km. Ålesund Vigra, Norway to Würzburg, Germany; 1450 km. Würzburg to Friedrichshafen, Germany; 240 km. Friedrichshafen, Germany to Lyon, France; 420 km. Lyon, France to Madrid, Spain; 920 km.

Journey South
Madrid to South Pole to Madrid.... (Miles noted are approximate flight distances in kilometers (km)).
Cuatro Vientos Airport, Madrid to Minorca Mahón Airport, Balearic Islands, Mediterranean Sea; 682 km. Minorca Mahón Airport, Balearic Islands to Malta International Airport, Luqa, Malta; 1008 km. Malta International Airport, Luqa, Malta to Marsa Matruh International Airport, Egypt; 1282 km. Mearsa Matruh International Airport, Egypt to Khartoum, Sudan; 1845 km. Khartoum, Sudan to Malindi Airport, Kenya; 2244 km. Malindi Airport, Kenya to Seychelles; 1720 km. Seychelles to Gan International Airport, Gan (Addu Atoll), Maldives; 2010 km. Gan, Maldives to Cocos (Keeling) Islands. 2911 km. Cocos Islands to Port Hedland, Western Australia, Australia; 2491 km. Port Hedland, Western Australia to Ayres Rock, Northern Territory; 1382 km. Ayres Rock, Northern Territory to Mildura, Victoria; 1471 km. Mildura, Victoria to Cambridge Aerodrome, Hobart, Tasmania; 1068 km. Cambridge Aerodrome, Hobart, Tasmania to Mario Zucchelli Station, Terra Nova Bay, Antarctica; 3643 km. From Mario Zucchelli Station to South Pole, 90 degrees South; 1710 km. South Pole, 90 degrees South to Marambio Base, Antarctica; 2876 km. Marambio, Antarctica to Ushuaia, Argentina; 1236 km. Ushuaia, Argentina to Comodoro Rivadavia, Argentina; 1000 km. Comodoro Rivadavia, Argentina to General Rodriguez Aerodrome, Buenos Aires, Argentina; 1200 km. General Rodriguez Aerodrome, Buenos Aires to Iguazu Falls, Argentina; 1401 km. Iguazu Falls, Argentina to Iguazu Falls, Brazil; 1 km. Iguazu Falls, Brazil to Campo dos Amarais Airport, Sao Paulo, Brazil; 808 km. Campo dos Amarais Airport, São Paulo, Brazil to Brasillia, Brazil; 223 km. Brasillia to São José de Mipibu, Natal, Brazil; 2392 km. São José de Mipibu, Natal, Brazil to Aeroporto Internacional de Natal, Sao Gonçalo; 31 km. Aeroporto Internacional de Natal, Sao Gonçalo to Praia Airport, Praia, Cabo Verde; 2652 km. Praia Airport, Praia, Cabo Verde to Lanzarote, Canary Islands; 1661 km. Lanzarote, Canary Islands to La Axarquía, Spain; 1461 km. La Axarquía, Spain to Cuatro Vientos Airport, Madrid, Spain; 394 km.

Endorsements and sponsors

 Ministerio de Fomento, Ministry of Public Works and Transport (Spain)
 Gobierno de Espana
spidertracks.com, FlightAware
 [Real Aeroclub de España
 FTEJerez, Flight Training Europe, ftejerez.com
 lxnav.com
 Magee Scientific 
 Aerosol d.o.o, aerosol.si, the Aethalometer®, an instrument for real-time aerosol black carbon monitoring.
 RocketRoute, rocketroute.com
 Softie Parachutes, softieparachutes.com
 Asian Academy of Aeronautics, aaa-fta.com
 College for Spanish Commercial Aviation, COPAC, copac.es
 Acciona
 fundacionenaire.com
 Aeroclub de Malaga
 Patrick Gilligan of Ottawa, Ontario, Canada provided custom built skis to fit the RV-8 aircraft for landing in Antarctica. Unofficial sponsor.

External links
 Sky Polaris site
 Andalusian Centre for the Environment
 Spanish Polar Committee

References

1955 births
People from Douala
People from Yaoundé
People from Cannes
People from Madrid
Spanish Air and Space Force
Spanish aviators
French glider pilots
Iberia (airline)
Anti-submarine warfare
Aeronautics
Aviation record holders
Experimental aircraft
Circumnavigators of the globe
Air sports
Climate change and the environment
Living people
Commercial aviators